Wilhelm Heyn (13 November 1910–31 October 1977) was a German middle-distance runner. He competed in the men's 3000 metres steeplechase at the 1936 Summer Olympics.

References

External links

1910 births
1977 deaths
Athletes (track and field) at the 1936 Summer Olympics
German male middle-distance runners
German male steeplechase runners
Olympic athletes of Germany
Place of birth missing